Bill Roorbach (born August 8, 1953 Chicago, Illinois) is an American novelist, short story and nature writer, memoirist, journalist, blogger and critic.

Roorbach has authored fiction and nonfiction works including Big Bend, which won the Flannery O'Connor Award for Short Fiction and the O. Henry Prize. Roorbach's memoir in nature, Temple Stream, won the Maine Literary Award for Nonfiction, 2005. His novel, Life Among Giants, won the 2013 Maine Literary Award for Fiction.[18]   And The Remedy for Love, also a novel, was one of six finalists for the 2014 Kirkus Fiction Prize.. His latest book, The Girl of the Lake, is a short story collection published in June 2017.  His novel in progress is Lucky Turtle.

Background
Bill Roorbach was born August, 1953 in Chicago, Illinois. The next year, his family moved to suburban Boston, Massachusetts, where he attended kindergarten. In 1959 the family moved to New Canaan, Connecticut, where he attended public schools from first grade on, graduating from New Canaan High School in 1971. In 1976, he was graduated from Ithaca College cum laude with a B.A. in Individual and Interdisciplinary Studies.

During what he has called his "writing apprenticeship,"  Roorbach traveled and worked a series of different jobs. He played piano and sang in a succession of bands, bartended, worked briefly on a cattle ranch, and worked extensively as a carpenter, plumber, and handyman. In January, 1987, he enrolled in the Master of Fine Arts Writing Program of the Columbia University Graduate School of the Arts, where he was awarded a School of the Arts Fellowship, a Fellowship of Distinction and an English Department teaching assistantship. In addition, he was a fiction editor of "Columbia: A Magazine of Poetry and Prose." He was graduated in May 1990.

Roorbach and his wife, painter Juliet Karelsen, have one daughter,  Elysia Pearl.

Academic career
Roorbach taught at the University of Maine at Farmington from 1991 to 1995  and subsequently at the Ohio State University from 1995 to 2001, winning tenure in 1998. In 2001, he quit his tenured position and returned with his family to Maine where he taught odd semesters as visiting full professor at Colby College. He wrote full-time until Fall, 2004, when he was awarded the William H.P. Jenks Chair of Contemporary American Letters at the College of the Holy Cross in Worcester, Massachusetts, a five-year position as full professor. He commuted from Maine to Worcester until April, 2009, when he returned to full-time writing. In the winter of 2019 Roorbach will return to teaching as a faculty member of the Newport MFA in creative writing at Salve Regina College.

Work
Roorbach sold his first book. Summers with Juliet, to Houghton Mifflin shortly after graduating from Columbia. In 1998, he published Writing Life Stories. During the interim, he published short work, both fiction and nonfiction, in a number of magazines and journals, including The New York Times Magazine, The Atlantic Monthly, Harper's Magazine, Playboy, The Missouri Review, and Granta, . His first novel, The Smallest Color, a collection of stories, Big Bend, and a collection of essays, Into Woods, written incrementally during the preceding decade, were published in a flurry in 2000 and 2001. Big Bend was featured on the NPR program Selected Shorts, performed by the actor James Cromwell. Contemporary Creative Nonfiction: The Art of Truth, a widely adopted anthology, was published in 2002 by Oxford University Press. In 2004, A Place on Water, which Bill wrote with poet Wesley McNair and essayist Robert Kimber was published by Tilbury House, a craft publisher in Maine. In 2005, the Dial Press (RandomHouse) published Bill's book Temple Stream: A Rural Odyssey, which was based on Bill's article of the same name in Harper's Magazine and won the Maine Literary Award in 2005. Roorbach's novel, Life Among Giants, won the 2013 Maine Literary Award for Fiction.[18]   And The Remedy for Love, also a novel, was one of six finalists for the 2014 Kirkus Fiction Prize.. His latest book, The Girl of the Lake, is a short story collection published in June 2017. His novel in progress is Lucky Turtle.

Awards
 2018 Civitella Ranieri Foundation Fellow, Umbria 
 2014 Kirkus Prize Finalist 
 2013 Maine Literary Award for Fiction 
 2006 Maine Prize for Literary Nonfiction
 2004-2009 William H.P. Jenks Chair in Contemporary Letters, College of the Holy Cross
 2004 Kaplan Foundation Fellow
 2002 O. Henry Prize
 2001 Flannery O'Connor Award for Short Fiction
 1999 National Endowment for the Arts Fellow

Bibliography

Novels
   (paperback 2003)

Nonfiction
 (paperback: Ohio State University Press, 2000)

(Reissue in Paperback: Down East Books, 2015) 
(Paperback: Down East Books, 2015) 
(Reissued by Downeast Books, 2014)

Short Story Collections
   (paperback: Counterpoint Press, 2003 )

Short Stories
 "Harbinger Hall" published in The Atlantic, December 2004; also included in The Girl of the Lake
 Kiva—First appeared under the title "Investigation" in Iron Horse. 
"The Fall"
"Murder Cottage"—Originally published in the short story collection, The Girl of The Lake .
"Princesa"—First appeared in the Missouri Review.
"Broadax, Inc."—First appeared in Ecotone. 
"The Tragedie of King Lear"—Originally published in the short story collection, The Girl of The Lake .
"Some Should"
"Dung Beetle"  
"The Girl of the Lake"—First appeared in Ecotone.

Anthologies

Essays

Interviews
Secret Passages "NY Times Book Review of Life Among Giants by Bill Roorbach", NY Times, February 22, 2013]
Bob Edwards - Bill Roorbach "Bob Edwards Interviews Bill Roorbach about Life Among Giants"]

References

External links
"Author's website"

1953 births
Writers from Chicago
People from New Canaan, Connecticut
21st-century American novelists
American male novelists
Ithaca College alumni
Columbia University School of the Arts alumni
University of Maine at Farmington faculty
Ohio State University faculty
Living people
American male short story writers
21st-century American short story writers
21st-century American male writers
Novelists from Illinois
Novelists from Ohio
Novelists from Maine